Events in the year 2020 in Somalia.

Incumbents
President: Mohamed Abdullahi Mohamed
Prime Minister: Hassan Ali Khaire

Events
Ongoing – Somali Civil War (2009–present); COVID-19 pandemic in Somalia

January
18 January – 2020 Afgooye bombing

May

4 May – Ethiopian National Defense Force soldiers at the  Bardelle airstrip in Baidoa shot down an African Express Airways Embraer EMB 120 Brasilia aircraft carrying coronavirus aid, after mistaking it for a suicide attack.

August
8 August
The Al-Shabaab militant group claims responsibility for a suicide bombing on a military base in Mogadishu that kills eight and injures fourteen.
The Law on Sexual Intercourse Related Crimes is introduced in the Federal Parliament of Somalia, which allows for forced marriage and for girls who reach puberty to be married.
16 August – Harakat al-Shabaab al-Mujahideen militants attack the Elite Hotel in Lido Beach, Mogadishu, killing eleven people.
18 August – Two soldiers are executed after being convicted for raping a 10-year-old boy in July.

September
7 September – Three Somali special forces soldiers are killed and a U.S. soldier and a Somali soldier are injured by a car bomb in Jana Cabdalle, Jubbaland.
17 September: President Mohamed Abdullahi Mohamed appoints Mohamed Hussein Roble as prime minister, replacing Hassan Ali Khaire who was voted out in July. He further announces that the parliamentary elections later in the year would not be held under a one person, one vote system.

December
1–27 December: Scheduled dates for the 2020 Somali parliamentary election.
10 December – U.S. warplanes bomb a stronghold of al-Qaida-linked al-Shabaab rebels.
15 December – Somalia cuts diplomatic ties with Kenya after Muse Bihi Abdi, president of Somaliland visits Kenya.
21 December – The United States sends the USS Makin Island and other warships with 2,500 marines to cover the withdrawal of its 800 troops, leaving only a small contingent to guard the embassy.

Deaths
 24 March – Mohamed Farah, footballer (b. 1961).
 1 April – Nur Hassan Hussein, politician, former Prime Minister (b. 1938).
 7 April – Hudeydi, oud player (b. 1928).
10 May – Abdikani Mohamed Wa'ays, diplomat (ambassador to Egypt and the Arab League); died of COVID-19 in Kuwait
 12 July – Hassan Abshir Farah, politician, former Prime Minister (b. 1945).
8 October – Ali Khalif Galaydh, 78, politician, Prime Minister (2000–2001), MP (since 2012) and President of Khatumo State (since 2014).
18 November – Umar Ghalib, 90, politician, Prime Minister (1991–1993) and Minister of Foreign Affairs (1969–1976).

See also

2020 in Somaliland
2020 in East Africa
COVID-19 pandemic in Africa
Al-Shabaab (militant group)

References

 
2020s in Somalia
Years of the 21st century in Somalia
Somalia
Somalia